Cyrtoprora is an extinct genus of damesellid odontopleurid trilobite.  It lived from 501 to 490 million years ago during the Dresbachian faunal stage of the late Cambrian Period.

References

Damesellidae
Odontopleurida genera
Cambrian trilobites
Trilobites of Asia